Tanjung Ringgit is a cape located on the eastern coast line of Lombok Island, Indonesia.

The area is surrounded by conserved forest owned by the Ministry of Forestry. Its inhabitants are mainly farmers.

Tourism
Tanjung Ringgit has white sand beaches and a long white rock cliff where one can find old cave used by Japanese soldiers during World War II.

Tanjung Ringgit is a 2 hour drive from Mataram, Lombok's main city.

Landforms of Lombok
Beaches of Indonesia
Ringgit